The 2016 America East women's basketball tournament is a tournament that began March 5 and concluded with the championship game on March 11 at SEFCU Arena. Albany defeated Maine in the championship to win their 5th consecutive American East tournament title and earn an automatic trip NCAA women's tournament.

Seeds
Teams are seeded by record within the conference, with a tiebreaker system to seed teams with identical conference records.

Schedule
All tournament games are nationally televised on an ESPN network:

Bracket and Results

All times listed are Eastern

See also
America East Conference
2016 America East men's basketball tournament

References

Tournament
America East Conference women's basketball tournament